Margaret Hoffman (June 19, 1911 – March 25, 1991) was an American competition swimmer who represented the United States at the 1928 Summer Olympics and 1932 Summer Olympics.  In 1928 she finished fifth in the women's 200-metet breaststroke event with a time of 3:19.2.  Four years later in 1932, she again finished fifth in the 200-meter breaststroke event at the Los Angeles Games, clocking an improved time of 3:11.8.

References

1911 births
1991 deaths
American female breaststroke swimmers
Olympic swimmers of the United States
Sportspeople from Wilkes-Barre, Pennsylvania
Swimmers at the 1928 Summer Olympics
Swimmers at the 1932 Summer Olympics
20th-century American women